Screen test may refer to:

Screen test, the practice or evaluation of actors, make-up, and lighting in film
Screen Test (film), a 1937 short Australian documentary directed by Charles Chauvel
Rough ride (police brutality), also called a screen test, in which an unrestrained prisoner is thrown about an erratically-driven police vehicle
Screen Tests, a series of "living portrait" films created by Andy Warhol
Screen Test, a children's film-clip game show on BBC television 
Don Adams' Screen Test, an American game show that aired during 1975-76